Jonathan Xu (born 7 September 1983) is a Singaporean footballer who plays for Project Vaults Oxley SC as a midfielder.

Club career

Geylang International
Xu started his footballing career in 2009 when he signed for Geylang International.

Tanjong Pagar United
In 2010, it was announced that Xu would join Tanjong Pagar ahead of the 2011 S.League season.

Admiralty FC
After 2 years at Tanjong Pagar, Xu joined Admiralty FC in 2013 and he played in the NFL, division 1.

Balestier Khalsa
Xu returned to the S.League in 2014, where he joined Balestier Khalsa. Winning the Singapore Cup that year and earning a contract extension. He also won the runners up for the League Cup with the team. He made history scoring his career first goal in the AFC Cup against East Bengal, it is also the club's first ever goal in the tournament, the Tigers won 2-1 that match which was also their first AFC Cup victory. On 7 August 2015, he scored his only goal in the S. League against Hougang United and this goal was nominated for the goal of the season.

Eunos Crescent
Xu once again returned to the NFL in 2016. He joined Eunos Crescent where he became the captain, scored many goals and won the league with the team.

Honours

Club
Geylang United
 Singapore Cup: 2009

Balestier Khalsa
 Singapore Cup: 2014
 League Cup: 2015 (Runners up)

Eunos Crescent
 National Football League, Division 1: 2016

References

1983 births
Living people
Singaporean footballers
Singaporean sportspeople of Chinese descent
Association football midfielders
Balestier Khalsa FC players
Geylang International FC players
Tanjong Pagar United FC players